Abchuiyeh (also Romanized as Ābchū’īyeh; also known as Āb Chūbeh and Āb Chuya) is a village in Tudeshk Rural District, Kuhpayeh District, Isfahan County, Isfahan Province, Iran. At the 2006 census, its population was 60, in 18 families.

References 

Populated places in Isfahan County